Galaxiella pusilla, the dwarf galaxias or little galaxias, is small Australian freshwater fish from the galaxiid family.

References

External links 
 Native Fish Australia

Freshwater fish of Australia
pusilla
Fish described in 1936